The Sand River (formerly Zandrivier) is a river in the Free State, South Africa. It is located close to Welkom and Virginia in the gold mining center of the Free State. This river is famous because of the historical Sand River Convention signed nearby, an important event in South African political history.

Catchment and tributaries
The Sand River is a tributary of the Vet, in turn a tributary of the Vaal. It is considered part of the Middle Vaal Catchment Management Area. It is only dammed by the Allemanskraal Dam in the Willem Pretorius Nature Reserve.

History

The Sand River Convention that led to the independence of the Transvaal Republic was signed in a marquee on the banks of the Sand River on 17 January 1852.

On 25 March 25, 1900, during the guerrilla phase of the Anglo-Boer War, a Council-of-War led by the Boers that wanted to continue with the hostilities was held at a bridge over the Sand River.

In 1988 the Sand River burst its banks and flooded parts of Virginia town. In 1994 the Merriespruit tailings dam disaster occurred just outside Virginia, killing seventeen people.

The river was named after an incident where a wagon got bogged down in its sand, and had to be unloaded before the journey could continue.

See also 
 Sand River Convention
 Second Boer War
 List of rivers of South Africa
 List of reservoirs and dams in South Africa

References

External links
Free State Region River Systems
The Anglo-Boer War – The Second British Offensive

Rivers of the Free State (province)